Chizh & Co is a Russian rock band, formed in the early 1990s by guitarist, vocalist and songwriter Sergey Chigrakov. It was named The Band of a Year by Rock-Fuzz Magazine  in 1997.

Discography

See also
Phantom (Russian song)

References

External links
Chizh & Co official site (in Russian)
 

Russian rock music groups
Musical groups from Saint Petersburg
Musical groups established in 1993
Blues rock groups